DSPnano is an embedded real-time operating system (RTOS) which is compatible with POSIX and embedded Linux.  It was first created in 1996 and was one of the first pthread based real-time kernels.  Its entire focus was on tiny real-time digital signal processing systems and has been optimized to deliver high performance DSP on embedded digital signal controllers and digital signal processors .  Its parent was the Unison Operating System.

Today DSPnano claims full POSIX capabilities for threads, communication, synchronization and I/O.  A full complement of I/O is included as is a full complement of DSP optimized features including: DSP libraries, fix size buffer management, software pipelines and more.  It has also been moved to FPGA platforms to accelerate DSP applications.

Typical processors that DSPnano runs on today include: Microchip PIC microcontroller (24, 30, 33 and 32), Renesas M16C, ARM and more.

Licensing
While RoweBots claims that DSPnano is an open source product, its license is not certified by the Open Source Initiative and the license agreement explicitly prohibits redistribution of the source code.  It is currently proprietarily licensed as a result of this.

References 

Real-time operating systems
Embedded operating systems
Embedded Linux
ARM operating systems
Hobbyist operating systems